Ajker Fariad is an Indian Bengali language daily newspaper published from Agartala, Tripura.

See also 

 Agartala

References

External links 

 ajkerfariad.co.in official website
Ajker Fariad wikimapia.org

Bengali-language newspapers published in India